The Kinema Junpo Awards for Best Film of the Year is given by Kinema Junpo as part of its annual Kinema Junpo Awards for Japanese films. The award was first given in 1927, but regarded the 1926 season (since then, every award has been given for movies released in the previous year). Here is a list of the award winners.

Winners

External links
Kinema Junpo on IMDb

Awards for best film
Japanese film awards
Awards established in 1927
1927 establishments in Japan